The Neskonlith Indian Band (sometimes Neskainlith) is a First Nations government in the Canadian province of British Columbia located in the Shuswap district east of Kamloops.  It is a member of the Shuswap Nation Tribal Council, one of two main governmental bodies of the Secwepemc (Shuswap) people.  It was created when the government of the Colony of British Columbia established an Indian reserve system without the consent and without consultation with the indigenous population of the colony, in the 1860s.  The Neskonlith Indian Band is named after Chief Neskonlith, and co-established by Chief Careguire, Chief Neskonlith's father.  The original reserve created is what is known as the Neskonlith Douglas Reserve.

The Neskonlith Indian Band is divided into three reserves, two near Chase, British Columbia, and one near Salmon Arm, British Columbia.  The band currently has around 600 members.

Reserves
Neskonlith Indian Band has jurisdiction over the three following reserves:
 Neskonlith 1 (Neskainlith 1)
 Neskonlith 2 (Neskainlith 2)
 Switsemalph 3

See also

Shuswap Nation Tribal Council
Northern Shuswap Tribal Council
George Manuel
Squilax, British Columbia

External links
Neskonlith Indian Band website
Shuswap Nation website

Secwepemc governments
Shuswap Country